James Carson (1912 – date of death unknown) was a Scottish professional footballer who played as a winger. He was born in Clydebank, near Glasgow, and played 70 matches in the Football League for Bradford Park Avenue, Crystal Palace and Burnley.

References

1912 births
Year of death missing
Scottish footballers
Association football wingers
Bradford (Park Avenue) A.F.C. players
Crystal Palace F.C. players
Burnley F.C. players
Alloa Athletic F.C. players
English Football League players